Aungier is a surname. Notable people with the surname include:

Gerald Aungier (1640–1677), English colonial governor
Francis Aungier, 1st Baron Aungier of Longford (1558–1632), Anglo-Irish judge
Francis Aungier, 1st Earl of Longford ( 1632–1700), Anglo-Irish politician